The Battle of Pelekanon, also known by its Latinised form Battle of Pelecanum, occurred on June 10–11, 1329 between an expeditionary force by the Byzantines led by Andronicus III and an Ottoman army led by Orhan I. The Byzantine army was defeated, with no further attempt made at relieving the cities in Anatolia under Ottoman siege.

Background
By the accession of Andronicus in 1328, the Imperial territories in Anatolia had dramatically shrunk from almost all of the west of modern Turkey forty years earlier to a few scattered outposts along the Aegean Sea and a small core province around Nicomedia within about 150 km of the capital city Constantinople. Recently the Turks had captured the important city of Prusa (Bursa) in Bithynia. Andronicus decided to relieve the important besieged cities of Nicomedia and Nicaea, and hoped to restore the frontier to a stable position.

Clash and outcome
Together with the Grand Domestic John Cantacuzene, Andronicus led an army of about 4,000 men, which was the greatest he could muster. They marched along the Sea of Marmara towards Nicomedia. At Pelekanon, a Turkish army led by Orhan I had encamped on the hills to gain a strategic advantage and blocked the road to Nicomedia. On 10 June, Orhan sent 300 cavalry archers downhill to lure the Byzantines unto the hills, but these were driven off by the Byzantines, who were unwilling to advance further. The belligerent armies engaged in indecisive clashes until nightfall. The Byzantine army prepared to retreat, but the Turks gave them no chance. Both Andronicus and Cantacuzene were lightly wounded, while rumors spread that the Emperor had either been killed or mortally wounded, resulting in panic. Eventually the retreat turned into a rout with heavy casualties on the Byzantine side. Cantacuzene led the remaining Byzantine soldiers back to Constantinople by sea.

Consequences
The Battle of Pelekanon was the first engagement in which a Byzantine emperor encountered an Ottoman Bey. The battle's effect on morale was more important than the battle itself as the heavily armed and disciplined Byzantines had fled before the lightly armed and irregular Turks. A campaign of restoration was aborted. Never again did a Byzantine army attempt to regain territory in Asia. The former imperial capitals of Nicomedia and Nicaea were not relieved and the maintenance of Imperial control across the Bosphorus was no longer tenable. The Ottomans conquered Nicaea in 1331 and Nicomedia in 1337, thus building up a strong base from which they eventually swept away the Byzantine Empire as a whole. The inhabitants of Nicaea and Nicomedia were quickly incorporated into the growing Ottoman nation, and many of them had already embraced Islam by 1340. With the capture of these cities and the annexation of the Beylik of Karasi in 1336, the Ottomans had completed their conquest of Bithynia and the north-western corner of Anatolia.

Notes

References
 Bartusis, Marc C. The Late Byzantine Army: Arms and Society, 1204–1453, University of Pennsylvania Press, 1997.
 Treadgold, W. A History of the Byzantine State and Society. Stanford University Press, 1997.

Pelekanon
Pelekanon
Pelekanon
Pelekanon
1320s in the Byzantine Empire
Pelekanon
1329 in the Ottoman Empire
History of Kocaeli Province
Byzantine Bithynia